The 1984 Indianapolis Colts season was the 32nd season for the team in the National Football League (NFL) and first in Indianapolis, as they relocated from Baltimore after the 1983 NFL season. The Colts finished the year with a record of 4 wins and 12 losses, and fourth in the AFC East division. In their inaugural game in Indianapolis, they lost 23–14 to the New York Jets and did not win their first game at Indianapolis until week 5, when they defeated the Buffalo Bills 31–17. The Colts would lose five games in a row (including another one to the Bills, who started the season 0-11 and finished 2–14) to end the season and miss the playoffs for the 7th straight season.

The Colts' 2,107 passing yards and 4,132 total yards gained on offense were the fewest in the league in 1984.

Personnel

Staff

Roster

Schedule

Standings

Regular season

Game summaries

Week 2: vs. Houston Oilers

Week 8 vs. Pittsburgh 
"Good Things come to those who hustle", are words attributed by Pittsburgh's eventual Hall of Fame coach Chuck Noll when he recalled Franco Harris Immaculate Reception in 1972. Those words were never so true when Ray Butler scored in the last minute of play off a deflected pass to give the Colts a dramatic 17–16 win over the eventual AFC Central Division champion Steelers. The 54-yard score capped a 17-point fourth quarter for the Colts, as they moved on drives of 57, 77 and 80 yards for the Colts third victory for the season.

See also 
 History of the Indianapolis Colts
 Indianapolis Colts seasons
 Colts–Patriots rivalry

References 

Indianapolis Colts
Indianapolis Colts seasons
Baltimore